Monkey Dance is a 2004 documentary film by Julie Mallozzi. 

Monkey Dance may also refer to:

Monkey (dance), a novelty dance from the early 1960s
"The Monkey Dance", a track by The Wiggles on Hot Potatoes: The Best of the Wiggles
Monkey Dance, an album by Soulfarm

See also
"Dance Monkey", a 2019 song by Tones and I